is a Japanese composer and pianist primarily known for her work in video games. She graduated from the Osaka College of Music in 1988 and began working in the video game industry by joining Capcom the same year. She wrote music for several games there, including Final Fight, Street Fighter II, and The King of Dragons. 

Shimomura left Capcom and joined Square (now Square Enix) in 1993, with her first project there being Live A Live. She would later become better known for writing the music for Kingdom Hearts, which was her last game at Square before leaving to become a freelancer in 2002. She founded a music production company, Midiplex, the following year. Despite leaving Square Enix, she has continued to compose for the Kingdom Hearts series and other games such as The 3rd Birthday and Final Fantasy XV.

Other well-known games Shimomura has worked on include Super Mario RPG, the Mario & Luigi series, Parasite Eve, Legend of Mana, and Xenoblade Chronicles. Her works have gained a great deal of popularity and have been performed in multiple video game music concerts. Music from several of her games have been published as arranged albums and piano scores. She is also a member of the music label Brave Wave Productions.

Early life
Shimomura was born on October 19, 1967, in Hyōgo Prefecture, Japan. She developed an interest for music at a young age, and started taking piano lessons "at the age of four or five". She began composing her own music by playing the piano randomly and pretending to compose, eventually coming up with her own pieces, the first of which she says she still remembers how to play. Shimomura attended Osaka College of Music, and graduated as a piano major in 1988.

Upon graduation, Shimomura intended to become a piano instructor and was extended a job offer to become a piano teacher at a music store, but as she had been an avid gamer for many years she decided to send some samples of her work to various video game companies that were recruiting at the university. Capcom invited her in for an audition and interview, and she was offered a job there. Her family and instructors were dismayed with her change in focus, as video game music was not well respected, and "they had paid [her] tuition for an expensive music school and couldn't understand why [she] would accept such a job", but Shimomura accepted the job at Capcom anyway.

Career
While working for Capcom, Shimomura contributed to the soundtracks of over 16 games, including the successful Street Fighter II, which she composed all but three pieces for. The first soundtrack she worked on at the company was for Samurai Sword in 1988. Final Fight, in 1989, was her first work to receive a separate soundtrack album release, on an album of music from several Capcom games. The first soundtrack album to exclusively feature her work came a year later for the soundtrack to Street Fighter II. While she began her tenure at Capcom working on games for video game consoles, by 1990 she had moved to the arcade game division. She was a member of the company's in-house band Alph Lyla, which played various Capcom game music, including pieces written by Shimomura. She performed live with the group on a few occasions, including playing piano during Alph Lyla's appearance at the 1992 Game Music Festival.

In 1993, Shimomura left Capcom to join another game company, Square. She stated that the move was done because she was interested in writing "classical-style" music for fantasy role-playing games. While working for Capcom, she was in the arcade department and was unable to transfer to the console department to work on their role-playing video game series Breath of Fire, although she did contribute one track to the first game in the series. Her first project at Square was the score for the role-playing video game Live A Live in 1994. While she was working on the score to Super Mario RPG the following year, she was asked to join Noriko Matsueda on the music to the futuristic role-playing game Front Mission. Although she was overworked doing both scores and it was not the genre that she was interested in, she found herself unable to refuse after her first attempt to do so unexpectedly happened in the presence of the president of Square, Tetsuo Mizuno. These games were followed by Tobal No. 1, the last score she worked on with another composer for a decade.

Over the next few years, she composed the soundtrack to several games, including Parasite Eve and Legend of Mana. Of all her compositions, Shimomura considers the soundtrack to Legend of Mana the one that best expresses herself and the soundtrack remains Shimomura's personal favourite. Parasite Eve on the PlayStation had the first soundtrack by Shimomura that included a vocal song, as it was the first game she had written for running on a console system that had the sound capability for one. In 2002 she wrote the score for Kingdom Hearts, which she has said is the most "special" soundtrack to her, as well as a turning point in her career; she named the soundtracks to Street Fighter II and Super Mario RPG as the other two significant points in her life as a composer.

Kingdom Hearts was wildly successful, shipping more than four million copies worldwide; Shimomura's music was frequently cited as one of the highlights of the game, and the title track has been ranked as the fourth-best role-playing game title track of all time. The soundtrack has led to two albums of piano arrangements. Kingdom Hearts was the last soundtrack that she worked on at Square. After the release of Kingdom Hearts in 2002, Shimomura left Square for maternity leave, and began work as a freelancer in 2003. She has built on the work she did while at Square; since leaving she has composed or is composing music for eleven Kingdom Hearts games and Nintendo's Mario & Luigi series. She has also worked on many other projects, such as Heroes of Mana and various arranged albums. In February 2014, Shimomura played piano at a retrospective 25th anniversary concert at Tokyo FM Hall. She performed songs from games such as Kingdom Hearts, Live a Live, and Street Fighter II. During the Beware the Forest's Mushrooms performance from Super Mario RPG, Shimomura was joined onstage by fellow composer Yasunori Mitsuda, who played the Irish bouzouki. She most recently composed and produced the majority of the score for Final Fantasy XV, which she began writing for in 2006, a decade before the game was released. She is also a member of the music label Brave Wave Productions.

Legacy
Shimomura has been cited as one of the most well-known video game music composers. Shimomura's best works compilation album, titled Drammatica: The Very Best of Yoko Shimomura, was released in March 2008. The album contains compositions from Kingdom Hearts and many other games she worked on in full orchestration, with Shimomura stating that she chose music that was popular among fans and well-suited for orchestration, but had never been performed by an orchestra before. In a 2008 interview with Music4Games regarding the project, Shimomura commented that with the sheet music generated for the project, she would be interested in pursuing a live performance of Drammatica for fans if the opportunity arose. In March 2009, that wish was realized when it was announced that Arnie Roth would conduct the Royal Stockholm Philharmonic Orchestra at the concert Sinfonia Drammatica in the Stockholm Concert Hall, which would combine music from the album with performances of Chris Hülsbeck's Symphonic Shades concert. The concert took place in August 2009. In March 2007, Shimomura released her first non-video game album, Murmur, an album of vocal songs sung by Chata.

Shimomura's music for Kingdom Hearts made up one fourth of the music of the Symphonic Fantasies concerts in September 2009, which were produced by the creators of the Symphonic Game Music Concert series and conducted by Arnie Roth. Legend of Manas title theme was also performed by the Australian Eminence Symphony Orchestra for its classical gaming music concert A Night in Fantasia 2007.

Music from the original soundtrack of Legend of Mana was arranged for the piano and published by DOREMI Music Publishing. Two compilation books of music from the series have also been published as Seiken Densetsu Best Collection Piano Solo Sheet Music first and second editions, with the second including Shimomura's tracks from Legend of Mana. All songs in each book have been rewritten by Asako Niwa as beginning to intermediate level piano solos, though they are meant to sound as much like the originals as possible. Additionally, piano sheet music from Kingdom Hearts and Kingdom Hearts II has been published as music books by Yamaha Music Media.

Shimomura's first dedicated concert performance outside Japan was held at the Salle Cortot in Paris in November 2015. Later that same month, she performed at the El Plaza Condesa in Mexico City. In September 2016, some of her music for Final Fantasy XV was performed by the London Philharmonic Orchestra at Abbey Road Studios in London, as well as in Boston, with Shimomura herself performing on piano.

Shimomura composed for the concert work Merregnon: Land of Silence. Her work was performed by the Royal Stockholm Philharmonic Orchestra and filmed at the Stockholm Concert Hall in 2021. Worldwide performances are planned starting in 2022.

Musical style and influences
Shimomura lists Ludwig van Beethoven, Frédéric Chopin, and Maurice Ravel as some of her influences on her personal website. She has also stated that she has enjoyed "lounge-style jazz" for a long time. Despite these influences and her classical training, the diverse musical styles that she has used throughout her career and sometimes in the same soundtrack include "rock, electronica, oriental, ambient, industrial, pop, symphonic, operatic, chiptune, and more". She draws inspiration for her songs from things in her life that move her emotionally, which she describes as "a beautiful picture, scenery, tasting something delicious, scents that bring back memories, happy and sad things... Anything that moves my emotion gives me inspiration". Shimomura has also stated that she comes up with most of her songs when she is doing something that is "not part of [her] daily routine, like traveling." Although her influences are mostly classical, she has said that in her opinion her "style has changed dramatically over the years, though the passion for music stays the same." Shimomura has said that she believes that an important part of "the creative process behind music" is to "convey a subtle message, something that comes from your imagination and sticks with the listener, without being overly specific about what it means", rather than only writing simple themes with obvious messages. She stated her favorite composition was "Dearly Beloved" from Kingdom Hearts.

Works

Video games

Composition

Arrangements

Other works

References

External links

  
 Brave Wave profile
 
 

1967 births
Alph Lyla members
Anime composers
Capcom people
Freelance musicians
Japanese film score composers
Japanese music arrangers
Japanese pianists
Japanese women composers
Japanese women film score composers
Japanese women musicians
Japanese women pianists
Living people
Musicians from Hyōgo Prefecture
Square Enix people
Video game composers
Osaka College of Music alumni